Catalina Andeme Engonga Mangue (born 14 July 1991) is an Equatorial Guinean footballer who plays as a midfielder for Huracanes FC and the Equatorial Guinea women's national team.

Club career
Andeme has played for Deportivo Evinayong in Equatorial Guinea.

International career
Andeme competed for Equatorial Guinea at the 2018 Africa Women Cup of Nations, playing in three matches and scoring one goal.

References

1991 births
Living people
Equatoguinean women's footballers
Women's association football midfielders
Equatorial Guinea women's international footballers